ARCAM may refer to:

 ARCAM Corporation, a fictional company in the Spriggan manga series
 ARCAM Private Army
 A&R Cambridge Ltd, a British manufacturer of hi-fi equipment branded ARCAM
 Amsterdam Centre for Architecture, an information center in the Netherlands
 U.S. Army Reserve Components Achievement Medal, United States Armed Forces

See also
 Arcam AB, Swedish company
 Arkham (disambiguation)